Giles Heneage Radice, Baron Radice,  (4 October 1936 – 25 August 2022) was a British Labour politician and author. He served as a Member of Parliament (MP) from 1973 to 2001, representing part of County Durham, and then as a life peer in the House of Lords from 2001 until shortly before his death in 2022.

Early life
Radice was born in London on 4 October 1936, the son of a civil servant in the Indian Government, Lawrence Radice. His mother, Patricia, was the daughter of Conservative politician Arthur Heneage. Radice was educated at Winchester College and Magdalen College, Oxford. His national service was with the Coldstream Guards. He then worked as a research officer for the General and Municipal Workers' Union and was chair of the Young Fabians from 1967 to 1968.

Parliamentary career
Radice first stood for Parliament at Chippenham in 1964 and 1966, but came third each time. He was elected Labour Member of Parliament for Chester-le-Street from a 1973 by-election to 1983 and then North Durham until his retirement in 2001.

Radice served as Education spokesman in the Labour Shadow Cabinet under Neil Kinnock in the 1980s. As chairman of the Treasury Select Committee, Radice helped make the monetary policy committee of the Bank of England accountable to both Parliament and the people for its decisions over interest rates. He was a member of the House of Lords European Union Sub-Committee on external affairs until March 2015.

A europhile, Radice was one of only five Labour MPs to vote for the Third Reading of the Maastricht Treaty in 1993, defying his party Whip, which was to abstain.

He was made a life peer as Baron Radice, of Chester-le-Street in the County of Durham, on 16 July 2001. He retired from the House of Lords on 1 August 2022.

Writing and political ideas 
As an advocate for Labour to ditch traditional dogmas, Radice has been described as a forerunner to Tony Blair. In his 1989 book Labour's Path to Power: The New Revisionism, Radice set out his vision for a modernised Labour Party, which included abandoning Clause IV of the party constitution. His 1992 pamphlet "Southern Discomfort" also made a case for reform, arguing that Labour did not appear supportive of economic aspiration, and this was costing them support from working class voters in Southern England, particularly London.

Philip Stephens later wrote in the Financial Times, At that time, Giles Radice, then an MP, wrote a brilliant essay on what he called Labour's 'southern discomfort'.  The party would not win, he argued, unless and until it managed to connect its ambitions for social justice with the individualistic aspirations of the voters in southern England. Here was the template for Mr Blair.

Radice returned to this theme following Labour's 2010 defeat: his "Southern Discomfort Again" pamphlet (with Patrick Diamond) found that voters perceived that Labour had run out of steam, were out of touch (particularly on immigration), unfair and poorly led. In this pamphlet and in "Southern Discomfort: One Year On" (2011), Radice warned that the 'southern problem' is more than geographical: social change means that Labour support collapsed in other areas, including the Midlands. A committed pro-European, Radice was a leading member both of the European Movement and Britain in Europe, and wrote a polemic called Offshore in 1992, in which he put the case for Britain in Europe.

After his retirement as an MP in 2001 Radice, wrote Friends and Rivals, an acclaimed triple biography of three modernisers from an earlier generation—Roy Jenkins, Denis Healey, and Anthony Crosland—arguing that their failure to work more closely together had harmed the modernising cause. This was followed by The Tortoise and the Hares, a comparative biography of Clement Attlee, Ernest Bevin, Stafford Cripps, Hugh Dalton and Herbert Morrison. Trio: Inside the Blair, Brown, Mandelson Project was published in 2010. In a review of Trio, Andrew Blick wrote that, "With his previous work Friends and Rivals (2002) and The Tortoise and the Hares (2008), Radice developed a distinctive approach to contemporary history, using group biography ....Radice adds to his historical approach not only a readable writing style, but the judgements of an experienced Labour politician."

Other positions
Lord Radice had been a member of the advisory board of the Centre for British Studies of Berlin's Humboldt University since 1998. He was also a member of the Fabian Society. Radice was a chair of the British Association for Central and Eastern Europe (BACEE), and chair of the European Movement, from 1995 to 2001. He was also a chairman of Policy Network, the international progressive thinktank based in London.

Personal life
Radice married Penelope Angus in 1959; they had two daughters and divorced in 1969. In 1971, he married historian Lisanne Koch. He was a longtime resident of Camden, living in Gloucester Crescent in the 1960s before relocating to Parliament Hill.

Radice died from cancer on 25 August 2022, at age 85.

Books 
 Divide and rule : the Industrial Relations Bill. (with J. O. N. Vickers) Fabian Society, London. 1971 
 Community socialism. Fabian Society, London. 1979
 Equality and quality: a socialist plan for education. Fabian Society, London. 1986
 Labour's Path to Power: The New Revisionism Palgrave Macmillan, 1989, 
 Offshore: Britain and the European Idea I.B.Tauris, 1992, 
 The New Germans Michael Joseph, 1995, 
 Friends and Rivals Octagon Press, 2003, 
 Diaries 1980–2001: The Political Diaries of Giles Radice Orion, 2004, 
 The Tortoise and the Hares: Attlee, Bevin, Cripps, Dalton, Morrison Politicos Publishing, 2008, 
 Trio: Inside the Blair, Brown, Mandelson Project I.B.Tauris, 2010, 
 Southern Discomfort Fabian Society, 1992, 978-0716305552
 More Southern Discomfort : a year on – taxing and spending Fabian Society, 1993
 Southern Discomfort Again (with Patrick Diamond) Policy Network, 2010
 Southern Discomfort Again: One Year On (with Patrick Diamond), Policy Network, 2011

References

External links
 
 
 

1936 births
2022 deaths
20th-century British male writers
20th-century British non-fiction writers
21st-century British male writers
21st-century British non-fiction writers
Alumni of Magdalen College, Oxford
British political writers
Chairs of the Fabian Society
Coldstream Guards officers
Deaths from cancer in England
GMB (trade union)-sponsored MPs
Labour Party (UK) MPs for English constituencies
Labour Party (UK) life peers
Life peers created by Elizabeth II
Members of the Privy Council of the United Kingdom
People educated at Winchester College
Place of death missing
Treasurers of the Fabian Society
UK MPs 1970–1974
UK MPs 1974
UK MPs 1974–1979
UK MPs 1979–1983
UK MPs 1983–1987
UK MPs 1987–1992
UK MPs 1992–1997
UK MPs 1997–2001
Writers from London